Shushenskoye is an urban locality (an urban-type settlement) and the administrative center of Shushensky District of Krasnoyarsk Krai, Russia, located at the confluence of the Yenisei and Big Shush rivers. Population:

History and culture

Vladimir Lenin was in internal exile here from 1897 to 1900. In 1970, a museum dedicated to his time in Siberia was opened which became a prominent and popular local site. Russian and international visitors go there to see the history of Lenin's stay as well as to see the peasant way of life during the 19th century. The area is also known for its nature reserves.

During 2003 and 2004, an ethnic music festival called the Sayan Ring was started in Shushenskoye, which draws visitors from Russia and other countries. Different ethno-music styles are played during its 3–4 day duration.

Climate
The climate is very warm in summer: local people cultivate melons and watermelons.

References

External links
Official website of the Sayan Ring festival

Urban-type settlements in Krasnoyarsk Krai
Shushensky District
Yeniseysk Governorate
Vladimir Lenin
Populated places on the Yenisei River